Oak Lake is a lake in Polk County, in the U.S. state of Minnesota.

Oak Lake was so named for the oak trees near the lake shore.

See also
List of lakes in Minnesota

References

Lakes of Minnesota
Lakes of Polk County, Minnesota